This is a list of international trips made by kings of Iran in modern days (20th century).

Qajar dynasty

Naser al-Din Shah

Mozaffar ad-Din Shah

Ahmad Shah

Pahlavi dynasty

Reza Shah

Mohammad Reza Shah

See also
 List of international trips made by presidents of Iran
 Foreign relations of Iran

References

External links

Foreign relations of Iran
Iran history-related lists
Iran diplomacy-related lists
Lists of diplomatic visits by heads of state
Qajar Iran
Pahlavi Iran